Merseyside County Council (MCC) was, from 1974 to 1986, the upper-tier administrative body for  Merseyside, a metropolitan county in North West England.

MCC existed for a total of twelve years. It was established on 1 April 1974 by the Local Government Act 1972. However, along with the other five metropolitan county councils and the Greater London Council it was abolished on 31 March 1986 by the Local Government Act 1985.

Premises

The county council had its main administrative offices at Metropolitan House at 95 Old Hall Street in Liverpool, renting part of the building from its owners, the Liverpool Echo and Daily Post newspaper group. The county council held its meetings at Liverpool Town Hall.

Political control
The first election to the council was held in 1973, initially operating as a shadow authority before coming into its powers on 1 April 1974. Political control of the council from 1973 until its abolition in 1986 was held by the following parties:

Leadership
Until 1980, the leader of the council also held the formal role of chairman of the council. In 1980 the two roles were separated, with the chairmanship becoming largely ceremonial whilst political leadership was provided by the leader of the council. The first leader and chairman of the county council, Bill Sefton, had been the last leader of Liverpool City Council before the 1974 reforms took effect. The leaders of Merseyside County Council were:

Council elections
 1973 Merseyside County Council election
 1977 Merseyside County Council election
 1981 Merseyside County Council election

References

History of Merseyside
Local authorities in Merseyside
1986 disestablishments in England
Former county councils of England
Council elections in Merseyside